Bernardo Arndt (born 10 June 1967) is a Brazilian sailor. He competed at the 1988 Summer Olympics, the 1992 Summer Olympics, and the 2004 Summer Olympics.

References

External links
 

1967 births
Living people
Brazilian male sailors (sport)
Olympic sailors of Brazil
Sailors at the 1988 Summer Olympics – 470
Sailors at the 1992 Summer Olympics – 470
Sailors at the 2004 Summer Olympics – 470
Sportspeople from São Paulo